Laza, Azerbaijan may refer to:
Laza, Qabala, Azerbaijan
Laza, Qusar, Azerbaijan